The Ming dynasty (23 January 1368 – 25 April 1644), officially the Great Ming, founded by the peasant rebel leader Zhu Yuanzhang, known as the Hongwu Emperor, was an imperial dynasty of China. It was the successor to the Yuan dynasty and the predecessor of the short-lived Shun dynasty, which was in turn succeeded by the Qing dynasty. At its height, the Ming dynasty had a population of 160 million people, while some assert the population could actually have been as large as 200 million.

Ming rule saw the construction of a vast navy and a standing army of 1,000,000 troops. Although private maritime trade and official tribute missions from China took place in previous dynasties, the size of the tributary fleet under the Muslim eunuch admiral Zheng He in the 15th century surpassed all others in grandeur. There were enormous projects of construction, including the restoration of the Grand Canal, the restoration of the Great Wall as it is seen today, and the establishment of the Forbidden City in Beijing during the first quarter of the 15th century.  The Ming dynasty is, for many reasons, generally known as a period of stable effective government.  It had long been the most secure and unchallenged ruling house that China had known up until that time.  Its institutions were generally preserved by the following Qing dynasty.  The civil service dominated government to an unprecedented degree at this time.  During the Ming dynasty, the territory of China expanded (and in some cases also retracted) greatly.  For a brief period during the Ming dynasty northern Vietnam was included in the Ming dynasty's territory.  Other important developments include the moving of the capital from Nanjing to Beijing.

Outside of metropolitan areas, Ming China was divided into thirteen provinces for administrative purposes.  These provinces were divided along traditional and to a degree also natural lines.  These include Zhejiang, Jiangxi, Huguang, Fujian, Guangdong, Guangxi, Shandong, Henan, Shanxi, Shaanxi, Sichuan, Yunnan and Guizhou.  These provinces were vast areas, each being at least as large as England.  The longest Ming reign was that of the Wanli Emperor, who ruled for forty eight years. (1572–1620).  The shortest was his son's reign, the Taichang Emperor, who ruled for only one month (in 1620).

Founding of the dynasty

Revolt and rebel rivalry
The Mongol-led Yuan dynasty (1279–1368) ruled before the establishment of the Ming dynasty. Alongside institutionalized ethnic discrimination against the Han people that stirred resentment and rebellion, other explanations for the Yuan's demise included overtaxing areas hard-hit by crop failure, inflation, and massive flooding of the Yellow River as a result of the abandonment of irrigation projects. Consequently, agriculture and the economy were in shambles and rebellion broke out among the hundreds of thousands of peasants called upon to work on repairing the dikes of the Yellow River.

A number of ethnic Han groups revolted, including the Red Turbans in 1351. The Red Turbans were affiliated with the Buddhist secret society of the White Lotus, which propagated Manichean beliefs in the struggle of good against evil and worship of the Maitreya Buddha. Zhu Yuanzhang was a penniless peasant and Buddhist monk who joined the Red Turbans in 1352, but soon gained a reputation after marrying the foster daughter of a rebel commander. In 1356 Zhu's rebel force captured the city of Nanjing, which he would later establish as the capital of the Ming dynasty. Zhu enlisted the aid of many able advisors, including the artillery specialists Jiao Yu and Liu Bowen.

Zhu cemented his power in the south by eliminating his arch rival and rebel leader Chen Youliang in the Battle of Lake Poyang in 1363. This battle was—in terms of personnel—one of the largest naval battles in history. After the dynastic head of the Red Turbans suspiciously died in 1367 while hosted as a guest of Zhu, the latter made his imperial ambitions known by sending an army toward the Yuan capital in 1368. The last Yuan emperor fled north into Mongolia and Zhu declared the founding of the Ming dynasty after razing the Yuan palaces in Dadu (present-day Beijing) to the ground.

Instead of the traditional way of naming a dynasty after the first ruler's home district, Zhu Yuanzhang's choice of 'Ming' or 'Brilliant' for his dynasty followed a Mongol precedent of an uplifting title. Zhu Yuanzhang also took 'Hongwu', or 'Vastly Martial' as his reign title. Although the White Lotus had fomented his rise to power, the emperor later denied that he had ever been a member of their organization and suppressed the religious movement after he became emperor.

Zhu Yuanzhang, founder of the Ming dynasty, drew on both past institutions and new approaches in order to create 'jiaohua' (meaning 'civilization') as an organic Chinese governing process.  This included a building of schools at all levels and an increased study of the classics as well as books on morality.  Also included was the distribution of Neo-Confucian ritual manuals and a new civil service examination system for recruitment into the bureaucracy.

Reign of the Hongwu Emperor

The Hongwu Emperor immediately set to rebuilding state infrastructure. The Ming Shi states that as early as 1364 Zhu Yuanzhang had begun drafting a new Confucian law code known as the Daming Lu, which was completed by 1397 and repeated certain clauses found in the old Tang Code of 653. The Hongwu Emperor organized a military system known as the weisuo, which was similar to the fubing system of the Tang dynasty (618–907). The goal was to have soldiers become self-reliant farmers in order to sustain themselves while not fighting or training. This system was also similar to the Yuan dynasty military organization of a hereditary caste of soldiers and a hereditary nobility of commanders. The system of the self-sufficient agricultural soldier, however, was largely a farce; infrequent rations and awards were not enough to sustain the troops, and many deserted their ranks if they weren't located in the heavily supplied frontier.

Although a Confucian, the Hongwu Emperor had a deep distrust for the scholar-officials of the gentry class and was not afraid to have them beaten in court for offenses. In favor of Confucian learning and the civil service, the emperor ordered every county magistrate to open a Confucian school in 1369—following the tradition of a nationwide school system first established by Emperor Ping of Han (9 BC–5 AD). However, he halted the civil service examinations in 1373 after complaining that the 120 scholar-officials who obtained a jinshi degree were incompetent ministers. After the examinations were reinstated in 1384, he had the chief examiner executed after it was discovered that he allowed only candidates from the south to be granted jinshi degrees. In 1380, the Hongwu Emperor had the Chancellor Hu Weiyong executed upon suspicion of a conspiracy plot to overthrow him; after that the emperor abolished the Chancellery and assumed this role as chief executive and emperor. With a growing amount of suspicion for his ministers and subjects, the Hongwu Emperor established the Jinyiwei, a network of secret police drawn from his own palace guard. They were partly responsible for the loss of 100,000 lives in several major purges over three decades of his rule.

North-Western Frontier

Multiple conflicts arose with the Ming dynasty fighting against the Uyghur Kingdom of Turpan and Oirat Mongols on the Northwestern Border, near Gansu, Turpan, and Hami. The Ming dynasty took control of Hami (under a small kingdom called Qara Del) in 1404 and turned it into Hami Prefecture In 1406, the Ming dynasty defeated the ruler of Turpan., which would lead to a lengthy war. The Moghul ruler of Turpan Yunus Khan, also known as Ḥājjī `Ali (ruled 1462–78), unified Moghulistan (roughly corresponding to today's Eastern Xinjiang) under his authority in 1472.  Asserting his newfound power, Ḥājjī `Ali sought redress of old grievances between the Turpanians and Ming China began over the restrictive tributary trade system. Tensions rose, and in 1473 he led a campaign east to confront China, even succeeding in capturing Hami from the Oirat Mongol ruler Henshen. Ali traded control of Hami with the Ming, then Henshen's Mongols, in numerous battles spanning the reigns of his son Ahmed and his grandson Mansur in a drawn-out and complex series of conflicts now known as the Ming–Turpan conflict.

South-Western Frontier

In 1381, the Ming dynasty annexed the areas of the southwest that had once been part of the Kingdom of Dali, which was annihilated by the Mongols in the 1250s and became established as the Yunnan Province under Yuan dynasty later on. By the end of the 14th century, some 200,000 military colonists settled some 2,000,000 mu (350,000 acres) of land in what is now Yunnan and Guizhou. Roughly half a million more Chinese settlers came in later periods; these migrations caused a major shift in the ethnic make-up of the region, since more than half of the roughly 3,000,000 inhabitants at the beginning of the Ming dynasty were non-Han peoples. In this region, the Ming government adopted a policy of dual administration. Areas with majority ethnic Chinese were governed according to Ming laws and policies; areas where native tribal groups dominated had their own set of laws while tribal chiefs promised to maintain order and send tribute to the Ming court in return for needed goods. From 1464 to 1466, the Miao and Yao people of Guangxi, Guangdong, Sichuan, Hunan, and Guizhou revolted against what they saw as oppressive government rule; in response, the Ming government sent an army of 30,000 troops (including 1,000 Mongols) to join the 160,000 local troops of Guangxi and crushed the rebellion. After the scholar and philosopher Wang Yangming (1472–1529) suppressed another rebellion in the region, he advocated joint administration of Chinese and local ethnic groups in order to bring about sinification in the local peoples' culture.

Relations with Tibet

The Mingshi— the official history of the Ming dynasty compiled later by the Qing court in 1739—states that the Ming established itinerant commanderies overseeing Tibetan administration while also renewing titles of ex-Yuan dynasty officials from Tibet and conferring new princely titles on leaders of Tibet's Buddhist sects. However, Turrell V. Wylie states that censorship in the Mingshi in favor of bolstering the Ming emperor's prestige and reputation at all costs obfuscates the nuanced history of Sino-Tibetan relations during the Ming era. Modern scholars still debate on whether or not the Ming dynasty really had sovereignty over Tibet at all, as some believe it was a relationship of loose suzerainty which was largely cut off when the Jiajing Emperor (r. 1521–1567) persecuted Buddhism in favor of Daoism at court. Helmut Hoffman states that the Ming upheld the facade of rule over Tibet through periodic missions of "tribute emissaries" to the Ming court and by granting nominal titles to ruling lamas, but did not actually interfere in Tibetan governance. Wang Jiawei and Nyima Gyaincain disagree, stating that Ming China had sovereignty over Tibetans who did not inherit Ming titles, but were forced to travel to Beijing to renew them. Melvyn C. Goldstein writes that the Ming had no real administrative authority over Tibet since the various titles given to Tibetan leaders already in power did not confer authority as earlier Mongol Yuan titles had; according to him, "the Ming emperors merely recognized political reality." Some scholars argue that the significant religious nature of the relationship of the Ming court with Tibetan lamas is underrepresented in modern scholarship. Others underscore the commercial aspect of the relationship, noting the Ming dynasty's insufficient number of horses and the need to maintain the tea-horse trade with Tibet. Scholars also debate on how much power and influence—if any—the Ming dynasty court had over the de facto successive ruling families of Tibet, the Phagmodru (1354–1436), Rinbung (1436–1565), and Tsangpa (1565–1642).

The Ming initiated sporadic armed intervention in Tibet during the 14th century, while at times the Tibetans also used successful armed resistance against Ming forays. Patricia Ebrey, Thomas Laird, Wang Jiawei, and Nyima Gyaincain all point out that the Ming dynasty did not garrison permanent troops in Tibet, unlike the former Mongol Yuan dynasty. The Wanli Emperor (r. 1572–1620) made attempts to reestablish Sino-Tibetan relations in the wake of a Mongol-Tibetan alliance initiated in 1578, the latter of which affected the foreign policy of the subsequent Manchu Qing dynasty (1644–1912) of China in their support for the Dalai Lama of the Yellow Hat sect. By the late 16th century, the Mongols proved to be successful armed protectors of the Yellow Hat Dalai Lama after their increasing presence in the Amdo region, culminating in Güshi Khan's (1582–1655) conquest of Tibet in 1642.

The Hongwu Emperor's vision, commercialization, and reversing his policies

Fusion of the merchant and gentry classes

In the first half of the Ming era, scholar-officials would rarely mention the contribution of merchants in society while writing their local gazetteer; officials were certainly capable of funding their own public works projects, a symbol of their virtuous political leadership. However, by the second half of the Ming era it became common for officials to solicit money from merchants in order to fund their various projects, such as building bridges or establishing new schools of Confucian learning for the betterment of the gentry. From that point on the gazetteers began mentioning merchants and often in high esteem, since the wealth produced by their economic activity produced resources for the state as well as increased production of books needed for the education of the gentry. Merchants began taking on the highly cultured, connoisseur's attitude and cultivated traits of the gentry class, blurring the lines between merchant and gentry and paving the way for merchant families to produce scholar-officials. The roots of this social transformation and class indistinction could be found in the Song dynasty (960–1279), but it became much more pronounced in the Ming. Writings of family instructions for lineage groups in the late Ming period display the fact that one no longer inherited his position in the categorization of the four occupations (in descending order): gentry, farmers, artisans, and merchants.

Courier network and commercial growth
The Hongwu Emperor believed that only government couriers and lowly retail merchants should have the right to travel far outside their home town. Despite his efforts to impose this view, his building of an efficient communication network for his military and official personnel strengthened and fomented the rise of a potential commercial network running parallel to the courier network. The shipwrecked Korean Ch'oe Pu (1454–1504) remarked in 1488 how the locals along the eastern coasts of China did not know the exact distances between certain places, which was virtually exclusive knowledge of the Ministry of War and courier agents. This was in stark contrast to the late Ming period, when merchants not only traveled further distances to convey their goods, but also bribed courier officials to use their routes and even had printed geographical guides of commercial routes that imitated the couriers' maps.

An open market, silver, and Deng Maoqi's rebellion

The scholar-officials' dependence upon the economic activities of the merchants became more than a trend when it was semi-institutionalized by the state in the mid Ming era. Qiu Jun (1420–1495), a scholar-official from Hainan, argued that the state should only mitigate market affairs during times of pending crisis and that merchants were the best gauge in determining the strength of a nation's riches in resources. The government followed this guideline by the mid Ming era when it allowed merchants to take over the state monopoly of salt production. This was a gradual process where the state supplied northern frontier armies with enough grain by granting merchants licenses to trade in salt in return for their shipping services. The state realized that merchants could buy salt licenses with silver and in turn boost state revenues to the point where buying grain was not an issue.

Silver mining was increased dramatically during the reign of the Yongle Emperor (1402–1424); production of mined silver rose from 3007 kg (80,185 taels) in 1403 to 10,210 kg (272,262 taels) in 1409. The Hongxi Emperor (r. 1424–1425) attempted to scale back silver mining to restore the discredited paper currency, but this was a failure which his immediate successor, the Xuande Emperor (r. 1425–1435), remedied by continuing the Yongle Emperor's silver mining scheme. The governments of the Hongwu and Zhengtong (r. 1435–1449) emperors attempted to cut the flow of silver into the economy in favor of paper currency, yet mining the precious metal simply became a lucrative illegal pursuit practiced by many.

The failure of these stern regulations against silver mining prompted ministers such as the censor Liu Hua (jinshi graduate in 1430) to support the baojia system of communal self-defense units to patrol areas and arrest 'mining bandits' (kuangzei). Deng Maoqi (died 1449), an overseer in this baojia defense units in Sha County of Fujian, abused local landlords who attempted to have him arrested; Deng responded by killing the local magistrate in 1447 and started a rebellion. By 1448, Deng's forces took control of several counties and were besieging the prefectural capital. The mobilization of local baojia units against Deng was largely a failure; in the end it took 50,000 government troops (including later Mongol rebels who sided with Cao Qin's rebellion in 1461), with food supplies supported by local wealthy elites, to put down Deng's rebellion and execute the so-called "King Who Eliminates Evil" in the spring of 1449. Many ministers blamed ministers such as Liu Hua for promoting the baojia system and thus allowing this disaster to occur. The historian Tanaka Masatoshi regarded "Deng's uprising as the first peasant rebellion that resisted the class relationship of rent rather than the depredations of officials, and therefore as the first genuinely class-based 'peasant warfare' in Chinese history."

The Hongwu Emperor was unaware of economic inflation even as he continued to hand out multitudes of banknotes as awards; by 1425, paper currency was worth only 0.025% to 0.014% its original value in the 14th century. The value of standard copper coinage dropped significantly as well due to counterfeit minting; by the 16th century, new maritime trade contacts with Europe provided massive amounts of imported silver, which increasingly became the common medium of exchange. As far back as 1436, a portion of the southern grain tax was commuted to silver, known as the Gold Floral Silver (jinhuayin). This was an effort to aid tax collection in counties where transportation of grain was made difficult by terrain, as well as provide tax relief to landowners. In 1581 the Single Whip Reform installed by Grand Secretary Zhang Juzheng (1525–1582) finally assessed taxes on the amount of land paid entirely in silver.

Reign of the Yongle Emperor

Rise to power

The Hongwu Emperor's grandson, Zhu Yunwen, assumed the throne as the Jianwen Emperor (r. 1398–1402) after the Hongwu Emperor's death in 1398. In a prelude to a three-year-long civil war beginning in 1399, The Jianwen Emperor became engaged in a political showdown with his uncle Zhu Di, the Prince of Yan. The emperor was aware of the ambitions of his princely uncles, establishing measures to limit their authority. The militant Zhu Di, given charge over the area encompassing Beijing to watch the Mongols on the frontier, was the most feared of these princes. After the Jianwen Emperor arrested many of Zhu Di's associates, Zhu Di plotted a rebellion. Under the guise of rescuing the young Jianwen Emperor from corrupt officials, Zhu Di personally led forces in the revolt; the palace in Nanjing was burned to the ground, along with the Jianwen Emperor, his wife, mother, and courtiers. Zhu Di assumed the throne as the Yongle Emperor (r. 1402–1424); his reign is universally viewed by scholars as a "second founding" of the Ming dynasty since he reversed many of his father's policies.

A new capital and a restored canal
The Yongle Emperor demoted Nanjing as a secondary capital and in 1403 announced the new capital of China was to be at his power base in Beijing. Construction of a new city there lasted from 1407 to 1420, employing hundreds of thousands of workers daily. At the center was the political node of the Imperial City, and at the center of this was the Forbidden City, the palatial residence of the emperor and his family. By 1553, the Outer City was added to the south, which brought the overall size of Beijing to 4 by 4½ miles.

After lying dormant and dilapidated for decades, the Grand Canal was restored under the Yongle Emperor's rule from 1411 to 1415. The impetus for restoring the canal was to solve the perennial problem of shipping grain north to Beijing. Shipping the annual 4,000,000 shi (one shi is equal to 107 liters) was made difficult with an inefficient system of shipping grain through the East China Sea or by several different inland canals that necessitated the transferring of grain onto several different barge types in the process, including shallow and deep-water barges. William Atwell quotes Ming dynasty sources that state the amount of collected tax grain was actually 30 million shi (93 million bushels), much larger than what Brook notes. The Yongle Emperor commissioned some 165,000 workers to dredge the canal bed in western Shandong and built a series of fifteen canal locks. The reopening of the Grand Canal had implications for Nanjing as well, as it was surpassed by the well-positioned city of Suzhou as the paramount commercial center of China. Despite greater efficiency, there were still factors which the government could not control that limited the transportation of taxed grain; for example, in 1420 a widespread crop failure and poor harvest dramatically reduced the tax grain delivered to the central government.

Although the Yongle Emperor ordered episodes of bloody purges like his father—including the execution of Fang Xiaoru, who refused to draft the proclamation of his succession—the emperor had a different attitude about the scholar-officials. He had a selection of texts compiled from the Cheng-Zhu school of Confucianism—or Neo-Confucianism—in order to assist those who studied for the civil service examinations. The Yongle Emperor commissioned two thousand scholars to create a 50-million-word (22,938-chapter) long encyclopedia—the Yongle Encyclopedia—from seven thousand books. This surpassed all previous encyclopedias in scope and size, including the 11th-century compilation of the Four Great Books of Song. Yet the scholar-officials were not the only political group that the Yongle Emperor had to cooperate with and appease. Historian Michael Chang points out that the Yongle Emperor was an "emperor on horseback" who often traversed between two capitals like in the Mongol tradition and constantly led expeditions into Mongolia. This was opposed by the Confucian establishment while it served to bolster the importance of eunuchs and military officers whose power depended upon the emperor's favor.

The treasure fleet

Beginning in 1405, the Yongle Emperor entrusted his favored eunuch commander Zheng He (1371–1433) as the naval admiral for a gigantic new fleet of ships designated for international tributary missions. The Chinese had sent diplomatic missions over land and west since the Han dynasty (202 BC–220 AD) and had been engaged in private overseas trade leading all the way to East Africa for centuries—culminating in the Song and Yuan dynasties—but no government-sponsored tributary mission of this grandeur size had ever been assembled before. To service seven different tributary missions abroad, the Nanjing shipyards constructed two thousand vessels from 1403 to 1419, which included the large Chinese treasure ships that measured 112 m (370 ft) to 134 m (440 ft) in length and 45 m (150 ft) to 54 m (180 ft) in width. The first voyage from 1405 to 1407 contained 317 vessels with a staff of 70 eunuchs, 180 medical personnel, 5 astrologers, and 300 military officers commanding a total estimated force of 26,800 men.

The enormous tributary missions were discontinued after the death of Zheng He, yet his death was only one of many culminating factors which brought the missions to an end. The Ming Empire had conquered and annexed Vietnam in 1407, but Ming troops were pushed out in 1428 with significant costs to the Ming treasury; in 1431 the new Lê dynasty of Vietnam was recognized as an independent tribute state. There was also the threat and revival of Mongol power on the northern steppe which drew court attention away from other matters. The Yongle Emperor had staged enormous invasions deep into Mongol territory, competing with Korea for lands in Manchuria as well. To face the Mongol threat to the north, a massive amount of funds were used to build the Great Wall after 1474. The Yongle Emperor's moving of the capital from Nanjing to Beijing was largely in response to the court's need of keeping a closer eye on the Mongol threat in the north. Scholar-officials also associated the lavish expense of the fleets with eunuch power at court, and so halted funding for these ventures as a means to curtail further eunuch influence.

The Tumu Crisis and the Ming Mongols

Succession crisis

The Oirat leader Esen Taishi launched an invasion into the Ming dynasty in July 1449. The chief eunuch Wang Zhen encouraged the Emperor Yingzong of Ming (r. 1435–1449) to personally lead a force to face the Mongols after a recent Ming defeat; marching off with 50,000 troops, the emperor left the capital and put his half-brother Zhu Qiyu in charge of affairs as temporary regent. In the battle that ensued, his force of 50,000 troops were decimated by Esen's army. On 3 September 1449, the Emperor Yingzong of Ming was captured and held in captivity by the Mongols—an event known as the Tumu Crisis. After the Emperor Yingzong of Ming's capture, Esen's forces plundered their way across the countryside and all the way to the suburbs of Beijing. Following this was another plundering of the Beijing suburbs in November of that year by local bandits and Ming dynasty soldiers of Mongol descent who dressed as invading Mongols. Many Han Chinese also took to brigandage soon after the Tumu incident.

The Mongols held the Emperor Yingzong of Ming for ransom. However, this scheme was foiled once the emperor's younger brother assumed the throne as the Jingtai Emperor (r. 1449–1457); the Mongols were also repelled once the Jingtai Emperor's confidant and defense minister Yu Qian (1398–1457) gained control of the Ming armed forces. Holding the Emperor Yingzong of Ming in captivity was a useless bargaining chip by the Mongols as long as another sat on his throne, so they released him back into the Ming dynasty. The Zhengtong Emperor was placed under house arrest in the palace until the coup against the Jingtai Emperor in 1457, which is known as the Duomen Coup ("Wresting the Gate Incident"). The Emperor Yingzong of Ming retook the throne (r. 1457–1464).

Relocation, migration, and northern raids

The Mongol threat to the Ming dynasty was at its greatest level in the 15th century, although periodic raiding continued throughout the dynasty. Like in the Tumu Crisis, the Mongol leader Altan Khan (r. 1470–1582) invaded the Ming dynasty and raided as far as the outskirts of Beijing. The Ming employed troops of Mongol descent to fight back Altan Khan's invasion, as well as Mongol military officers against Cao Qin's abortive coup of 1461. Mongol troops were also employed in the suppression of the Li people of Hainan in the early 16th century as well as the Liu Brothers and Tiger Yang in a 1510 rebellion. The Mongol incursions prompted the Ming authorities to construct the Great Wall from the late 15th century to the 16th century; John Fairbank notes that "it proved to be a futile military gesture but vividly expressed China's siege mentality." Yet the Great Wall was not meant to be a purely defensive fortification; its towers functioned rather as a series of lit beacons and signalling stations to allow rapid warning to friendly units of advancing enemy troops.

The Emperor Yingzong of Ming's second reign was a troubled one and Mongol forces within the Ming military structure continued to be problematic. Mongols serving the Ming military also became increasingly circumspect as the Ming began to heavily distrust their Mongol subjects after the Tumu Crisis. One method to ensure that Mongols could not band together in significant numbers in the north was a scheme of relocation and sending their troops on military missions to southern China. In January 1450, two thousand Mongol troops stationed in Nanjing were sent to Fujian in order to suppress a brigand army. The grand coordinator of Jiangxi, Yang Ning (1400–1458), suggested to the Jingtai Emperor that these Mongols be dispersed amongst the local battalions, a proposal that the emperor agreed to (the exact number of Mongols resettled in this fashion is unknown). Despite this, Mongols continued to migrate to Beijing. A massive drought in August 1457 forced over five hundred Mongol families living on the steppe to seek refuge in Ming territories, entering through the Piantou Pass of northwestern Shanxi. According to the official report by the chief military officer of Piantou Pass, all of these Mongol families populated Beijing, where they were granted lodging and stipends. In July 1461, after Mongols had staged raids in June into Ming territory along the northern tracts of the Yellow River, the Minister of War Ma Ang (1399–1476) and General Sun Tang (died 1471) were appointed to lead a force of 15,000 troops to bolster the defenses of Shaanxi. Historian David M. Robinson states that "these developments must also have fed suspicion about Mongols living in North China, which in turn exacerbated Mongol feelings of insecurity. However, no direct link can be found between the decision by the Ming Mongols in Beijing to join the [1461] coup and activities of steppe Mongols in the northwest."

The failed coup of 1461

On 7 August 1461, the Chinese general Cao Qin (died 1461) and his Ming troops of Mongol descent staged a coup against the Emperor Yingzong of Ming out of fear of being next on his purge-list of those who aided him in the Wresting the Gate Incident. On the previous day, the emperor issued an edict telling his nobles and generals to be loyal to the throne; this was in effect a veiled threat to Cao Qin, after the latter had his associate in the Jinyiwei beaten to death to cover up crimes of illegal foreign transactions. Due to the earlier demise of General Shi Heng in 1459, in a similar warning involving an imperial edict, Cao Qin was to take no chances in allowing himself to be ruined in similar fashion. The loyalty of Cao's Mongol-officer clients was secure due to circumstances of thousands of military officers who had to accept demotions in 1457 because of earlier promotions in aiding the Jingtai Emperor's succession. Robinson states that "Mongol officers no doubt expected that if Cao fell from power, they would soon follow." Cao either planned to kill Ma Ang and Sun Tang as they were to depart the capital with 15,000 troops to Shaanxi on the morning of 7 August, or he simply planned to take advantage of their leave. The conspirators are said to have planned to place their heir apparent on the throne and demote the Tianshun Emperor's position to "grand senior emperor", the title granted to him during the years of his house arrest.

After a failed plot to have Grand Secretary Li Xian send a memorial to the throne to pardon Cao Qin for killing Lu Gao, head of the Jinyiwei who had been investigating him, Cao Qin began the assault on Dongan Gate, East Chang'an Gate, and West Chang'an Gate, setting fire to the western and eastern gates; these fires were extinguished later in the day by pouring rain. Ming troops poured into the area outside the Imperial City to counterattack. By midday, Sun Tang's forces had killed two of Cao Qin's brothers and severely wounded Cao in both his arms; his forces took up position in the Great Eastern Market and Lantern Market northeast of Dongan Gate, while Sun deployed artillery units against the rebels. Cao lost his third brother, Cao Duo, while attempting to flee out of Beijing by the Chaoyang Gate. Cao fled with his remaining forces to fortify his residential compound in Beijing; Ming troops stormed the residence and Cao Qin committed suicide by throwing himself down a well. As promised by Li Xian before they stormed the residence, imperial troops were allowed to confiscate the property of Cao Qin for themselves.

Isolation to globalization
Ming rulers faced the challenge of balancing Central Asian trade and military threats against dangerous but profitable sea powers. The questions were cultural, political, and economic. The historian Arthur Waldron declares that the early rulers faced the question "Was the Ming to be essentially a Chinese version of the Yuan, or was it to be something new?" The Tang dynasty provided an example of cosmopolitan and culturally flexible rule, but the Song dynasty, which never controlled key areas of Central Asia, offered an example that was culturally Han Chinese. The dynasty was basically reshaped by it successes and frustrations in dealing with the two sides of the outside world.

Universal rulership
The early Ming emperors from the Hongwu Emperor to the Zhengde Emperor continued Yuan practices such as hereditary military institutions, demanding Korean and Muslim concubines and eunuchs, having Mongols serve in the Ming military, patronizing Tibetan Buddhism, with the early Ming Emperors seeking to project themselves as "universal rulers" to various peoples such as Central Asian Muslims, Tibetans, and Mongols. The Yongle Emperor cited Emperor Taizong of Tang as a model for being familiar with both China and the steppe people. The legacy of the Mongol Khan's as supporters of both Eastern and western religions, ruler ship over the plains and steppes, was claimed by the Ming such as patronizing Islam and using the Chinese, Persian, and Mongol languages in edicts on Islam which were also used by the Yuan to show the Ming were the heirs to this Yuan legacy.

Illegal trade, piracy, and war with Japan

In 1479, the vice president of the Ministry of War burned the court records documenting Zheng He's voyages; it was one of many events signalling China's shift to an inward foreign policy. Shipbuilding laws were implemented that restricted vessels to a small size; the concurrent decline of the Ming navy allowed the growth of piracy along China's coasts. Japanese pirates—or wokou—began staging raids on Chinese ships and coastal communities, although much of the acts of piracy were carried out by native Chinese.

Instead of mounting a counterattack, Ming authorities chose to shut down coastal facilities and starve the pirates out; all foreign trade was to be conducted by the state under the guise of formal tribute missions. These were known as the hai jin laws, a strict ban on private maritime activity until its formal abolishment in 1567. In this period government-managed overseas trade with Japan was carried out exclusively at the seaport of Ningbo, trade with the Philippines exclusively at Fuzhou, and trade with Indonesia exclusively at Guangzhou. Even then the Japanese were only allowed into port once every ten years and were allowed to bring a maximum of three hundred men on two ships; these laws encouraged many Chinese merchants to engage in widespread illegal trade and smuggling.

The low point in relations between Ming China and Japan occurred during the rule of the great Japanese warlord Hideyoshi, who in 1592 announced he was going to conquer China. In two campaigns (now known collectively as the Imjin War) the Japanese fought with the Korean and Ming armies. Though initially successful, the Japanese forces were pushed back southward after the intervention of Ming China. With the combined strength of Ming and Korean forces on land, and the naval prowess of Korean admiral Yi Sun-sin at sea, the campaign ended in defeat for the Japanese and their armies were forced to withdraw from the Korean peninsula. However, the victory came at relatively large cost to the Ming government's treasury: some 26,000,000 ounces of silver.

Trade and contact with Europe

The History of Ming, compiled during the early Qing dynasty, describes how the Hongwu Emperor met with an alleged merchant of Fu lin (拂菻; i.e. the Byzantine Empire) named "Nieh-ku-lun" (捏古倫). In September 1371 he had this man sent back to his native country with a letter announcing the founding of the Ming dynasty to his ruler (i.e. John V Palaiologos). It is speculated that the merchant was actually a former bishop of Khanbaliq (Beijing) called Nicolaus de Bentra, sent by Pope John XXII to replace archbishop John of Montecorvino in 1333. The History of Ming goes on to explain that contacts between China and Fu lin ceased after this point, whereas diplomats and other people of the great western sea (i.e. the Mediterranean Sea) did not appear in China again until the 16th century, with the Italian Jesuit missionary Matteo Ricci.

Although Jorge Álvares was the first to land on Lintin Island in the Pearl River Delta in May 1513, it was Rafael Perestrello—a cousin of the famed Christopher Columbus—who became the first known European explorer to land on the southern coast of mainland China and trade in Guangzhou in 1516, commanding a Portuguese vessel with a crew from a Malaysian junk that had sailed from Malacca. However, Chinese records maintain that a Roman embassy, perhaps only a group of Roman merchants, arrived at the Han capital city Luoyang by way of Jiaozhi (northern Vietnam) in 166 AD, during the reigns of emperor Marcus Aurelius (r. 161–180 AD) and Emperor Huan of Han (r. 146–168 AD). Although it could be coincidental, Antonine Roman golden medallions dated to the reigns of Marcus Aurelius and his predecessor Antoninus Pius have been discovered at Oc Eo, Vietnam (among other Roman artefacts in the Mekong Delta), a site that is one of the suggested locations for the port city of "Cattigara" along the Magnus Sinus (i.e. Gulf of Thailand and South China Sea) in Ptolemy's Geography. A much earlier Republican-era Roman glass bowl has been unearthed from a Western Han tomb of Guangzhou, along the South China Sea.

The Portuguese sent a large subsequent expedition in 1517 to enter port at Guangzhou to trade with the Chinese merchants there. During this expedition the Portuguese attempted to send an inland delegation in the name of Manuel I of Portugal to the court of the Zhengde Emperor. Although Fernão Pires de Andrade was able to meet the Zhengde Emperor while the latter was touring Nanjing in May 1520, Pires de Andrade's mission waited in Beijing to meet the Zhengde Emperor once more, but the emperor died in 1521. The new Grand Secretary Yang Tinghe rejected eunuch influence at court and rejected this new foreign embassy by the Portuguese once Malaccan ambassadors arrived in China damning the Portuguese for deposing their king; the Portuguese diplomatic mission languished in a Chinese prison where they died. Simão de Andrade, brother to ambassador Fernão Pires de Andrade, had also stirred Chinese speculation that the Portuguese were kidnapping Chinese children to cook and eat them; Simão had purchased children as slaves who were later found by Portuguese authorities in Diu, India. In 1521, Ming dynasty naval forces fought and repulsed Portuguese ships at Tuen Mun, where some of the first breech-loading culverins were introduced to China, and again fought off the Portuguese in 1522.

Despite initial hostilities, by 1549 the Portuguese were sending annual trade missions to Shangchuan Island. In the early 1550s, Leonel de Sousa—a later Governor of Macau—reestablished a positive image of Portuguese in the eyes of the Chinese and reopened relations with Ming officials. The Portuguese friar Gaspar da Cruz (c. 1520 – 5 February 1570) traveled to Guangzhou in 1556 and wrote the first book on China and the Ming dynasty that was published in Europe (fifteen days after his death); it included information on its geography, provinces, royalty, official class, bureaucracy, shipping, architecture, farming, craftsmanship, merchant affairs, clothing, religious and social customs, music and instruments, writing, education, and justice. In 1557 the Portuguese managed to convince the Ming court to agree on a legal port treaty that would establish Macau as a Portuguese trade colony on the coasts of the South China Sea. The Chinese found the Portuguese settlement useful in expelling hostile Japanese sailors, as well as a useful tool to control other aggressive European powers since the Portuguese repelled Dutch invasions of Macau in 1601, 1607, and 1622. The Dutch had even blockaded Zhangzhou's Moon Harbor in 1623 in order to force local authorities there to allow them to trade, while local Chinese merchants sent urgent petitions to the provincial governor pleading for him to allow the Dutch entry into port. China defeated the Dutch in the Sino–Dutch conflicts in 1622–1624 over the Penghu islands and again defeated the Dutch at the Battle of Liaoluo Bay in 1633. Chinese trade relations with the Dutch began to improve after 1637 and in 1639 the Japanese cut off trade with the Portuguese due to the Shimabara Rebellion, thus impoverishing Macau and leading to its decline as a major port.

From China the major exports were silk and porcelain. The Dutch East India Company alone handled the trade of 6 million porcelain items from China to Europe between the years 1602 to 1682. After noting the variety of silk goods traded to Europeans, Ebrey writes of the considerable size of commercial transactions:

In one case a galleon to the Spanish territories in the New World carried over 50,000 pairs of silk stockings. In return China imported mostly silver from Peruvian and Mexican mines, transported via Manila. Chinese merchants were active in these trading ventures, and many emigrated to such places as the Philippines and Borneo to take advantage of the new commercial opportunities.

After the Chinese had banned direct trade by Chinese merchants with Japan, the Portuguese filled this commercial vacuum as intermediaries between China and Japan. The Portuguese bought Chinese silk and sold it to the Japanese in return for Japanese-mined silver; since silver was more highly valued in China, the Portuguese could then use Japanese silver to buy even larger stocks of Chinese silk. However, by 1573—after the Spanish established a trading base in Manila—the Portuguese intermediary trade was trumped by the prime source of incoming silver to China from the Spanish Americas. Although it is unknown just how much silver flowed from the Philippines to China, it is known that the main port for the Mexican silver trade—Acapulco—shipped between 150,000 and 345,000 kg (4 to 9 million taels) of silver annually from 1597 to 1602.

Although the bulk of imports to China were silver, the Chinese also purchased New World crops from the Spanish Empire. This included sweet potatoes, maize, and peanuts, foods that could be cultivated in lands where traditional Chinese staple crops—wheat, millet, and rice—couldn't grow, hence facilitating a rise in the population of China. In the Song dynasty (960–1279), rice had become the major staple crop of the poor; after sweet potatoes were introduced to China around 1560, it gradually became the traditional food of the lower classes.

The beginning of relations between the Spanish and Chinese were much warmer than when the Portuguese were first given a reception in China. In the Philippines, the Spanish defeated the fleet of the infamous Chinese pirate Limahong in 1575, an act greatly appreciated by the Ming admiral who had been sent to capture Limahong. In fact, the Chinese admiral invited the Spanish to board his vessel and travel back to China, a trip which included two Spanish soldiers and two Christian friars eager to spread the faith. However, the friars returned to the Philippines after it became apparent that their preaching was unwelcome; Matteo Ricci would fare better in his trip of 1582. The Augustinian monk Juan Gonzáles de Mendoza wrote an influential work on China in 1585, remarking that the Ming dynasty was the best-governed kingdom he was aware of in the known world.

From his observation of textiles in the Manila inventory, the Spanish were buying:

...raw silk in bundles...fine untwisted silk, white and of all colors...quantities of velvets, some plain and some embroidered in all sorts of figures, colors, and fashions, with body of gold and embroidered with gold; woven stuff and brocades, of gold and silver upon silk of various colors and patterns...damasks, satins, taffetas...

Other goods that Antonio de Morga mentioned included were:

...musk, benzoin and ivory; many bed ornaments, hangings, coverlets and tapestries of embroidered velvet...tablecloths, cushions, and carpets; horse-trappings of the same stuffs, and embroidered with glass beads and seed-pearls; also pearls and rubies, sapphires and crystals; metal basins, copper kettles and other copper and cast-iron pots. . .wheat flour, preserves made of orange, peach, pair, nutmeg and ginger, and other fruits of China; salt pork and other salt meats; live fowl of good breed and many fine capons...chestnuts, walnuts...little boxes and writing cases; beds, tables, chairs, and gilded benches, painted in many figures and patterns. They bring domestic buffaloes; geese that resemble swans; horses, some mules and asses; even caged birds, some of which talk, while others sing, and they make them play innumerable tricks...pepper and other spices.

Decline

Reign of the Wanli Emperor

The financial drain of the Imjin War in Korea against the Japanese was one of the many problems—fiscal or other—facing Ming China during the reign of the Wanli Emperor (r. 1572–1620). In the beginning of his reign, the emperor surrounded himself with able advisors and made a conscientious effort to handle state affairs. His Grand Secretary Zhang Juzheng (in office from 1572 to 1582) built up an effective network of alliances with senior officials. However, there was no one after him skilled enough to maintain the stability of these alliances; officials soon banded together in opposing political factions. Over time, the Wanli Emperor grew tired of court affairs and frequent political quarreling amongst his ministers, preferring to stay behind the walls of the Forbidden City and out of his officials' sight.

Officials aggravated the Wanli Emperor about which of his sons should succeed to the throne; he also grew equally disgusted with senior advisors constantly bickering about how to manage the state. There were rising factions at court and across the intellectual sphere of China stemming from the philosophical debate for or against the teaching of Wang Yangming (1472–1529), the latter of whom rejected some of the orthodox views of Neo-Confucianism. Annoyed by all of this, the Wanli Emperor began neglecting his duties, remaining absent from court audiences to discuss politics, lost interest in studying the Confucian Classics, refused to read petitions and other state papers, and stopped filling the recurrent vacancies of vital upper level administrative posts. Scholar-officials lost prominence in administration as eunuchs became intermediaries between the aloof emperor and his officials; any senior official who wanted to discuss state matters had to persuade powerful eunuchs with a bribe simply to have his demands or message relayed to the emperor.

The role of eunuchs

It was said that the Hongwu Emperor forbade eunuchs to learn how to read or engage in politics. Whether or not these restrictions were carried out with absolute success in his reign, eunuchs in the Yongle era and after managed huge imperial workshops, commanded armies, and participated in matters of appointment and promotion of officials. The eunuchs developed their own bureaucracy that was organized parallel to but was not subject to the civil service bureaucracy. Not all eunuchs worked inside the palace; Zheng He and Yishiha were admirals. Although there were several dictatorial eunuchs throughout the Ming, such as Wang Zhen, Wang Zhi, and Liu Jin, excessive tyrannical eunuch power did not become evident until the 1590s when the Wanli Emperor increased their rights over the civil bureaucracy and granted them power to collect provincial taxes. Complaints about eunuchs abusing their powers of taxation, as well as tales of sexual predations and occult practices, surface in popular culture works such as Zhang Yingyu's "The Book of Swindles" (ca. 1617).

The eunuch Wei Zhongxian (1568–1627) dominated the court of the Tianqi Emperor (r. 1620–1627) and had his political rivals tortured to death, mostly the vocal critics from the faction of the "Donglin Society". He ordered temples built in his honor throughout the Ming Empire, and built personal palaces created with funds allocated for building the previous emperor's tombs. His friends and family gained important positions without qualifications. Wei also published a historical work lambasting and belitting his political opponents. The instability at court came right as natural calamity, pestilence, rebellion, and foreign invasion came to a peak. Although the Chongzhen Emperor (r. 1627–1644) had Wei dismissed from court—which led to Wei's suicide shortly after—the problem with court eunuchs persisted until the dynasty's collapse less than two decades later.

Economic breakdown

During the last years of the Wanli Emperor's reign and those of his two successors, an economic crisis developed that was centered around a sudden widespread lack of the empire's chief medium of exchange: silver. The Protestant powers of the Dutch Republic and the Kingdom of England staged frequent raids and acts of piracy against the Catholic-based empires of Spain and Portugal in order to weaken their global economic power. Meanwhile, Philip IV of Spain (r. 1621–1665) began cracking down on illegal smuggling of silver from Mexico and Peru across the Pacific towards China, in favor of shipping American-mined silver directly from Spain to Manila. In 1639, the new Tokugawa regime of Japan shut down most of its foreign trade with European powers, causing a halt of yet another source of silver coming into China. However, the greatest stunt to the flow of silver came from the Americas, while Japanese silver still came into China in limited amounts. Some scholars even assert that the price of silver rose in the 17th century due to a falling demand for goods, not declining silver stocks.

These events occurring at roughly the same time caused a dramatic spike in the value of silver and made paying taxes nearly impossible for most provinces. People began hoarding precious silver as there was progressively less of it, forcing the ratio of the value of copper to silver into a steep decline. In the 1630s, a string of one thousand copper coins was worth an ounce of silver; by 1640 this was reduced to the value of half an ounce; by 1643 it was worth roughly one-third of an ounce. For peasants this was an economic disaster, since they paid taxes in silver while conducting local trade and selling their crops with copper coins.

Natural disasters

In this early half of the 17th century, famines became common in northern China because of unusual dry and cold weather that shortened the growing season; these were effects of a larger ecological event now known as the Little Ice Age. Famine, alongside tax increases, widespread military desertions, a declining relief system, and natural disasters such as flooding and inability of the government to properly manage irrigation and flood-control projects caused widespread loss of life and normal civility. The central government was starved of resources and could do very little to mitigate the effects of these calamities. Making matters worse, a widespread epidemic spread across China from Zhejiang to Henan, killing a large but unknown number of people. The famine and drought in late 1620s and 1630s contributed to the rebellions that broke out in Shaanxi led by rebel leader such as Li Zicheng and Zhang Xianzhong.

Fall of the Ming

Rise of the Manchus

A Jurchen tribal leader named Nurhaci (r. 1616–1626), starting with just a small tribe, rapidly gained control over all the Manchurian tribes. During the Imjin War he offered to lead his tribes in support of the Ming army. This offer was declined, but he was granted honorific Ming titles for his gesture. Recognizing the weakness in the Ming authority north of their border, he took control over all of the other unrelated tribes surrounding his homeland. In 1610 he broke relations with the Ming court; in 1618 he demanded the Ming pay tribute to him to redress the seven grievances which he documented and sent to the Ming court. This was, in a very real sense, a declaration of war as the Ming were not about to pay money to the Manchu.

Under the brilliant commander Yuan Chonghuan (1584–1630), the Ming were able to repeatedly fight off the Manchus, notably in 1626 at the Battle of Ningyuan and in 1628. Under Yuan's command the Ming had securely fortified the Shanhai Pass, thus blocking the Manchus from crossing the pass to attack the Liaodong Peninsula. Using European firearms acquired from his cook, he was able to stave off Nurhaci's advances along the Liao River. Although he was named field marshal of all the northeastern forces in 1628, he was executed in 1630 on trumped-up charges of colluding with the Manchus as they staged their raids. Succeeding generals proved unable to eliminate the Manchu threat.

Unable to attack the heart of Ming directly, the Manchu instead bided their time, developing their own artillery and gathering allies. They were able to enlist Ming government officials and generals as their strategic advisors. A large part of the Ming Army deserted to the Manchu banner. In 1632, they had conquered much of Inner Mongolia, resulting in a large scale recruitment of Mongol troops under the Manchu banner and the securing of an additional route into the Ming heartland.

Han defectors played a massive role in the Qing conquest of China.  Han Chinese generals who defected to the Manchu were often given women from the Aisin Gioro family in marriage while the ordinary soldiers who defected were given non-royal Manchu women as wives. The Manchu leader Nurhaci married one of his granddaughters to the Ming general Li Yongfang after he surrendered Fushun in Liaoning to the Manchu in 1618 and a mass marriage of Han Chinese officers and officials to Manchu women numbering 1,000 couples was arranged by Prince Yoto and Hongtaiji in 1632 to promote harmony between the two ethnic groups. Jurchen (Manchu) women married most of the Han Chinese defectors in Liaodong. Aisin Gioro women were married to the sons of the Han Chinese generals Sun Sike, Geng Jimao, Shang Kexi, and Wu Sangui.

By 1636, the Manchu ruler Huang Taiji renamed his dynasty from the "Later Jin" to Great Qing at Shenyang, which had fallen to the Manchu in 1621 and was made their capital in 1625. Huang Taiji also adopted the Chinese imperial title huangdi instead of khan, took the imperial title Chongde ("Revering Virtue"), and changed the ethnic name of his people from Jurchen to Manchu. In 1638 the Manchu defeated and conquered Ming China's traditional ally Korea with an army of 100,000 troops in the Second Manchu invasion of Korea. Shortly after the Koreans renounced their long-held loyalty to the Ming dynasty.

Rebellion, invasion, collapse

A peasant soldier named Li Zicheng (1606–1644) mutinied with his fellow soldiers in western Shaanxi in the early 1630s after the government failed to ship much-needed supplies there. In 1634 he was captured by a Ming general and released only on the terms that he return to service. The agreement soon broke down when a local magistrate had thirty-six of his fellow rebels executed; Li's troops retaliated by killing the officials and continued to lead a rebellion based in Rongyang, central Henan province by 1635. By the 1640s, an ex-soldier and rival to Li—Zhang Xianzhong (1606–1647)—had created a firm rebel base in Chengdu, Sichuan, while Li's center of power was in Hubei with extended influence over Shaanxi and Henan.

In 1640, masses of Chinese peasants who were starving, unable to pay their taxes, and no longer in fear of the frequently defeated Chinese army, began to form into huge bands of rebels. The Chinese military, caught between fruitless efforts to defeat the Manchu raiders from the north and huge peasant revolts in the provinces, essentially fell apart. Unpaid, unfed, the army was defeated by Li Zicheng—now self-styled as the Prince of Shun—and deserted the capital without much of a fight. Li's forces were allowed into the city when the gates were treacherously opened from within. On 26 May 1644, Beijing fell to a rebel army led by Li Zicheng; during the turmoil, Chongzhen, the last Ming emperor, accompanied only by a eunuch servant, hanged himself on a tree in the imperial garden right outside the Forbidden City.

Seizing opportunity, the Manchus crossed the Great Wall after the Ming border general Wu Sangui (1612–1678) opened the gates at Shanhai Pass. This occurred shortly after he learned about the fate of the capital and an army of Li Zicheng marching towards him; weighing his options of alliance, he decided to side with the Manchus. The Manchu army under the Manchu Prince Dorgon (1612–1650) and Wu Sangui approached Beijing after the army sent by Li was destroyed at Shanhaiguan; the Prince of Shun's army fled the capital on the fourth of June. On 6 June the Manchus and Wu entered the capital and proclaimed the young Shunzhi Emperor ruler of China. After being forced out of Xi'an by the Manchus, chased along the Han River to Wuchang, and finally along the northern border of Jiangxi province, Li Zicheng died there in the summer of 1645, thus ending the Shun dynasty. One report says his death was a suicide; another states that he was beaten to death by peasants after he was caught stealing their food. Zhang Xianzhong was killed in January 1647 when one of his own officers, Liu Jinzhong defected to the Qing and pointed Zhang out to a Manchu archer after he fled Chengdu and employed a scorched earth policy.

Despite the loss of Beijing and the death of the emperor, Ming power was by no means totally destroyed. Nanjing, Fujian, Guangdong, Shanxi, and Yunnan were all strongholds of Ming resistance. However, there were several pretenders for the Ming throne, and their forces were divided. These scattered Ming remnants in southern China after 1644 were collectively designated by 19th-century historians as the Southern Ming. Each bastion of resistance was individually defeated by the Qing until 1662, when the last Southern Ming emperor, Zhu Youlang, the Yongli Emperor, was captured and executed. Despite the Ming defeat, smaller loyalist movements continued until the proclamation of the Republic of China.

See also
Beijing city fortifications
Fortifications of Xi'an
Kaifeng flood of 1642
List of tributaries of Imperial China
Luchuan-Pingmian Campaigns
Ming campaign against the Uriankhai
Ming Great Wall
Ming dynasty family tree
Ming dynasty military conquests
Ming official headwear
Treasure voyages
Ye Chunji (for further information on rural economics in the Ming)
Zheng Zhilong
Zheng He

Notes

References

Citations

Works cited

 .
 Andrew, Anita N. and John A. Rapp. (2000). Autocracy and China's Rebel Founding Emperors: Comparing chairman Mao and Ming Taizu. Lanham: Rowman & Littlefield Publishers Inc. .
 Atwell, William S. "Time, Money, and the Weather: Ming China and the "Great Depression" of the Mid-Fifteenth Century," The Journal of Asian Studies (Volume 61, Number 1, 2002): 83–113.
 .
Brook, Timothy. (1998). The Confusions of Pleasure: Commerce and Culture in Ming China. Berkeley: University of California Press.  (Paperback).
Chang, Michael G. (2007). A Court on Horseback: Imperial Touring & the Construction of Qing Rule, 1680–1785. Cambridge: Published by Harvard University Asia Center; distributed by Harvard University Press. .
Crosby, Alfred W., Jr. (2003). The Columbian Exchange: Biological and Cultural Consequences of 1492; 30th Anniversary Edition. Westport: Praeger Publishers. .
 .
Douglas, Robert Kennaway. (2006). Europe and the Far East. Adamant Media Corporation. .
 
Ebrey, Patricia, Anne Walthall, and James Palais. (2006). East Asia: A Cultural, Social, and Political History. Boston: Houghton Mifflin Company. .
Ebrey, Patricia Buckley. (1999). The Cambridge Illustrated History of China. Cambridge: Cambridge University Press.  (paperback).
Fairbank, John King and Merle Goldman. (1992). China: A New History; Second Enlarged Edition (2006). Cambridge; London: The Belknap Press of Harvard University Press.  (Paperback).
Gascoigne, Bamber. (2003). The Dynasties of China: A History. New York: Carroll & Graf Publishers.  (Paperback).
Gernet, Jacques (1962). Daily Life in China on the Eve of the Mongol Invasion, 1250–1276. Translated by H. M. Wright. Stanford: Stanford University Press. 
 
Hargett, James M. "Some Preliminary Remarks on the Travel Records of the Song Dynasty (960–1279)," Chinese Literature: Essays, Articles, Reviews (CLEAR) (July 1985): 67–93.
Ho, Ping-ti. (1959). Studies on the Population of China: 1368–1953. Cambridge: Harvard University Press.
Hoffman, Helmut. (2003). "Early and Medieval Tibet" in The History of Tibet: Volume 1, The Early Period to c. AD 850, the Yarlung Dynasty, ed. Alex McKay. New York: Routledge. .
Hucker, Charles O. "Governmental Organization of the Ming Dynasty," Harvard Journal of Asiatic Studies (Volume 21, December 1958): 1–66.
Laird, Thomas. (2006). The Story of Tibet: Conversations with the Dalai Lama. New York: Grove Press. .
 .
Mote, Frederick W. and Denis Twitchett. (1998). The Cambridge History of China; Volume 7–8. Cambridge: Cambridge University Press.  (Hardback edition).
 
Needham, Joseph (1986). Science and Civilisation in China: Volume 3, Mathematics and the Sciences of the Heavens and the Earth. (Cambridge Eng: Cambridge University Press).
 – (1986). Science and Civilisation in China: Volume 4, Physics and Physical Technology, Part 2, Mechanical Engineering. (Cambridge Eng: Cambridge University Press).
-- (1986). Science and Civilisation in China: Volume 4, Physics and Physical Technology, Part 3, Civil Engineering and Nautics. (Cambridge Eng: Cambridge University Press).
-- (1986). Science and Civilisation in China: Volume 5, Chemistry and Chemical Technology, Part 7, Military Technology; the Gunpowder Epic. (Cambridge Eng: Cambridge University Press).
-- (1986). Science and Civilisation in China: Volume 6, Biology and Biological Technology, Part 2: Agriculture. (Cambridge Eng: Cambridge University Press).
Robinson, David M. "Banditry and the Subversion of State Authority in China: The Capital Region during the Middle Ming Period (1450–1525)," Journal of Social History (Spring 2000): 527–563.
Robinson, David M. "Politics, Force and Ethnicity in Ming China: Mongols and the Abortive Coup of 1461," Harvard Journal of Asiatic Studies (Volume 59, Number 1, June 1999): 79–123. . .
 
Song, Yingxing, translated with preface by E-Tu Zen Sun and Shiou-Chuan Sun (1966). T'ien-Kung K'ai-Wu: Chinese Technology in the Seventeenth Century. University Park: Pennsylvania State University Press.
Spence, Jonathan D. (1999). The Search For Modern China; Second Edition. New York: W. W. Norton & Company.  (Paperback).
 
Wang, Jiawei and Nyima Gyaincain. (1997). The Historical Status of China's Tibet. China Intercontinental Press (五洲传播出版社). .
Wakeman, Frederick, Jr. "Rebellion and Revolution: The Study of Popular Movements in Chinese History," The Journal of Asian Studies (1977): 201–237.
Wylie, Turrell V. (2003). "Lama Tribute in the Ming Dynasty" in The History of Tibet: Volume 2, The Medieval Period: c. AD 850–1895, the Development of Buddhist Paramountcy, ed. Alex McKay. New York: Routledge. .
 .
 .
Yuan, Zheng. "Local Government Schools in Sung China: A Reassessment," History of Education Quarterly (Volume 34, Number 2; Summer 1994): 193–213.

Further reading
 
 
 
 Huang, Ray. (1982). 1587, A Year of No Significance: The Ming Dynasty in Decline. New Haven: Yale University Press.
 Wade, Geoff. 2008. "Engaging the South: Ming China and Southeast Asia in the Fifteenth Century". Journal of the Economic and Social History of the Orient 51 (4). BRILL: 578–638. .
 Source for "Fall of the Ming dynasty":- Dupuy and Dupuy's Collins Encyclopedia of Military History
 Dictionary of Ming Biography
 Edward L. Farmer, Romeyn Taylor, Ann Waltner, Ming History An Introductory Guide To Research (Minneapolis, University of Minnesota, 1994).